Family Law Act may refer to:

Family Law Act 1975, Australia
Family Law Act 1996, UK
Family Law Act (Alberta), Canada
Ontario Family Law Act, Canada